Köping FF is a Swedish football club located in Köping in Västmanland County. The senior team split off and formed a new club in 2014 which became known as MD FF Köping, the MD for sponsorship reasons. In 2016 the two clubs agreed to merge yet again and now both the senior team and the youth section are part of Köping FF.

Background
Since their foundation in 1990 Köping FF has participated mainly in the middle and lower divisions of the Swedish football league system.  The club currently plays in Division 3 Västra Svealand which is the fifth tier of Swedish football. 2010 they finished in eleventh position, just two points from safety, and got relegated back to Division 3 for the 2011 season. They play their home matches at the Köpings IP in Köping.

Köping FF are affiliated to the Västmanlands Fotbollförbund.

Season to season

Attendances

In recent seasons Köping FF have had the following average attendances:

References

External links
 Köping FF – Official website

Sport in Västmanland County
Football clubs in Västmanland County
Association football clubs established in 1990
1990 establishments in Sweden